Pegg is a surname, and may refer to

Dave Pegg, English folk rock musician
David Pegg, English footballer
David Pegg (physicist)
Dominique Pegg, Canadian Olympic gymnast
Ed Pegg, Jr., mathematician
Mark Pegg (actor), British actor and film producer
Mark Gregory Pegg, an Australian professor of medieval history
Simon Pegg, English actor, comedian and screenwriter
Matthew Pegg, Fire Chief, Toronto Fire Services

See also
Pegge

Occupational surnames
English-language occupational surnames